In philately a parcel stamp is a stamp specifically issued to pay the fee for the transport of a parcel through the postal system and usually marked as such. It is to be distinguished from a postage stamp used to pay the cost of posting a parcel, although there may no practical distinction as far as the sender is concerned. Parcel stamps issued by governments have the same status in philately as postage stamps, but parcel stamps issued by private railway companies or road carriers are regarded as cinderella stamps and many parcel stamps are also railway stamps. 

The international parcel post service was established by the Universal Postal Union on 1 October 1881 (Great Britain, India, The Netherlands and Persia, 1 April 1882), following the agreement of 1880 in Paris.

Belgium
Belgium has a long history of railway parcel stamps with the first being issued for the Belgian State Railways in 1879. Numerous different series have been issued since then.

Britain
Britain has not issued any stamps inscribed specifically for parcels, but several stamps have been overprinted with the words Govt. Parcels (Government Parcels). The overprints have been widely forged.

A wide variety of parcel stamps have been issued in Britain by private road operators including bus and tram companies.

Italy
The first Italian parcel stamps were issued in 1884 and since 1914 they have been in two parts marked pacchi postali. The right hand part was retained by the sender as a receipt and the left hand part applied to the parcel. By 1909/10, over 14 million parcels were being sent annually in Italy.

The United States
The first and last U.S. parcel stamps were issued in 1912, along with parcel postage due stamps.  In this series, which was soon discontinued, the 20-cent value is noteworthy for being the first postage stamp in the world to depict an airplane.

See also 
 U.S. Parcel Post stamps of 1912-13
Parcel post
Railway stamp
Bulletin d'expédition

References

Further reading 
Davey, P.N. The Parcel Post Stamps of China. Ashford: China Philatelic Society of London, 1989. 
Ewen, Herbert L'Estrange, Railway Newspaper and Parcel Stamps of the United Kingdom, Ewen’s Colonial Stamp Market Ltd., 1906. (Reprint, 1983 by Tim Clutterbuck & Co.)
Mann, John C. Parcel Post Meters of Great Britain. London: The Meter Stamp Study Group, 1962.

External links 
Australia and New Zealand Railway Parcel Stamps.
Congo Parcel Post Stamps Archive here.
Italian Parcel Stamps
Norwegian Parcel Stamps

Philatelic terminology
Freight transport